Monsters in the Closet is Swollen Members' third studio album released on Battleaxe Records. Monsters in the Closet is a collection of B-sides, rarities and unreleased tracks from the groups back catalog.  In order to properly promote the record however, three brand new songs were created, two of which became popular singles. "Steppin Thru" led the way, continuing their streak of successful singles. "Breath" was the next one, featuring one of their best known videos courtesy of Todd McFarlane, a Canadian artist primarily known for comic books like Spawn, also the music video ended up reaching #1 MuchMusic's Top 30 Countdown. Both singles did exceptionally well with videos that topped the MuchMusic Countdown and helped the record reach Gold Status almost immediately.  Notable guest appearances include Canadian artists Nelly Furtado and Saukrates. The album was certified gold by the CRIA with sales of over 70,000 copies across Canada.

Track listing

Charts

Year-end charts

References

Swollen Members albums
B-side compilation albums
Albums produced by Evidence (musician)
2002 compilation albums
Juno Award for Rap Recording of the Year recordings